Microcalcifications are tiny deposits of calcium salts that are too small to be felt but can be detected by imaging. They can be scattered throughout the mammary gland, or occur in clusters.
Microcalcifications can be an early sign of breast cancer. Based on morphology, it is possible to classify by radiography how likely microcalcifications are to indicate cancer.

Microcalcifications are made up of calcium oxalate and calcium phosphate. The mechanism of their formation is not known.

Microcalcification was first described in 1913 by surgeon Albert Salomon.

References 

Medical signs